Long Cay (formerly known as Fortune Island; ;) is an island in the Bahamas in an atoll that includes Acklins Island and Crooked Island.  It is 8 square miles (21 km²) and is in the Acklins and Crooked Islands District. , its population was 29.

Geography
Long Cay lies to the west of a shallow lagoon called the Bight of Acklins and is an extension of the western arm of Crooked Island, separated from it by a channel about one mile wide. The main town is Albert Town, now largely a ghost town. Douglas Town was another former settlement only about 500 meters from Albert Town. Great Salt Pond lies in the middle of the island. The southernmost point is known as Windsor Point, called Cabo Hermoso by Christopher Columbus.

History
On 19 October 1492, Long Cay was discovered by Columbus on his first voyage to the New World, and he named it Ysabela.

Albert Town became a port in the sponge and salt industries and a port of call for the Hamburg America Line and the Pacific Mail Steamship Company to recruit stevedore labour.

The grandfather of W. E. B. Du Bois was born on Long Cay in 1803.

References

Islands of the Bahamas